HMS Nelson was a  armoured cruiser built for the Royal Navy in the 1870s. She was sold for scrap in 1910.

Design and description
The Nelson-class ships were designed as enlarged and improved versions of HMS Shannon to counter the threat of enemy armoured ships encountered abroad. Nelson displaced , almost  more than Shannon. The steel-hulled ships were fitted with a ram and their crew numbered approximately 560 officers and other ranks.

The ship had a pair of three-cylinder, inverted compound steam engines, each driving a single propeller, using steam provided by 10 oval boilers. They were barque-rigged with three masts.

Construction and career

HMS Nelson, named after Vice-Admiral Horatio Nelson, was laid down by John Elder & Co. in Govan, Scotland on 2 November 1874, launched on 4 November 1876, and completed in July 1881. She sailed for the Australia Station after commissioning and became the flagship there in 1885. She remained on station until returning home in January 1889 for a lengthy refit. The ship then became guardship at Portsmouth in October 1891 and was placed in fleet reserve in November 1894. Nelson was degraded to dockyard reserve in April 1901 and hulked seven months later as a training ship for stokers. Commander Harry Stileman was appointed in command on 12 June 1902. She was sold for scrap in July 1910 for £14,500.

Notes

References

External links 

 Pictures of HMS Nelson
 Naval Historical Society of Australia
 Shipping Times: Clydebuilt Database

 

Nelson-class cruisers
Victorian-era cruisers of the United Kingdom
Ships built on the River Clyde
Ships built in Govan
1876 ships